The Sagog Formation, also known as the Sagok Formation, is an Albian geologic formation in South Korea.

Description 
Fossil sauropod tracks have been reported from the formation. It is laterally equivalent to the Haman Formation. It predominantly consists of red to dark grey shale and sandstone.

See also 
 List of dinosaur-bearing rock formations
 List of stratigraphic units with sauropodomorph tracks
 Sauropod tracks
 Geoncheonri Formation
 Guyedong Formation
 Hasandong Formation
 Jinju Formation

References

Bibliography

Further reading 
 Y.-N. Lee, K.-M. Yu, and C. B. Wood. 2001. A review of vertebrate faunas from the Gyeongsang Supergroup (Cretaceous) in South Korea. Palaeogeography, Palaeoclimatology, Palaeoecology 165:357-373

Geologic formations of South Korea
Lower Cretaceous Series of Asia
Cretaceous South Korea
Albian Stage
Ichnofossiliferous formations